Blood at the Root is a play by Dominique Morisseau that premiered in 2014 at Pennsylvania State University. The title Blood at the Root comes from the song Strange Fruit about the lynchings of African Americans in the South. The show was based on the Jena Six.

Productions
The show premiered at Penn State Center Stage at Pennsylvania State University on March, 28, 2014, directed by Steve H. Broadnax, choreography Aquila Kikora Franklin, set design Karl Jacobsen, costume design Montana Carly Reeder, lighting design Nathan Hawkins, and sound design Liz Sokolak. The cast included Stori Ayers (Raylynn), Allison Scarlet Jaye (Toria), Kenzie Ross (Asha), Brandon Carter (Justin), Tyler Reilly (Colin), and Christian Thompson (De'Andre). It would premiere two years later in New York City at the National Black Theatre.

References

2014 plays
African-American plays
American plays
Plays about race and ethnicity
Plays based on actual events
Plays set in Louisiana
Plays set in the United States